A station wagon (US, also wagon) or estate car (UK, also estate), is an automotive body-style variant of a sedan/saloon with its roof extended rearward over a shared passenger/cargo volume with access at the back via a third or fifth door (the liftgate or tailgate), instead of a trunk/boot lid. The body style transforms a standard three-box design into a two-box design — to include an A, B, and C-pillar, as well as a D-pillar. Station wagons can flexibly reconfigure their interior volume via fold-down rear seats to prioritize either passenger or cargo volume.

The American Heritage Dictionary defines a station wagon as "an automobile with one or more rows of folding or removable seats behind the driver and no luggage compartment but an area behind the seats into which suitcases, parcels, etc., can be loaded through a tailgate."

When a model range includes multiple body styles, such as sedan, hatchback, and station wagon, the models typically share their platform, drivetrain and bodywork forward of the A-pillar, and usually the B-pillar as well. In 1969, Popular Mechanics said, "Station wagon-style ... follows that of the production sedan of which it is the counterpart. Most are on the same wheelbase, offer the same transmission and engine options, and the same comfort and convenience options."

Station wagons have evolved from their early use as specialized vehicles to carry people and luggage to and from a train station, especially to estates, and have been marketed worldwide. However, the demand for the station wagon body style has faded since the 2010s.

Name 
Reflecting the original purpose of transporting people and luggage between country estates and train stations, the body style is called an "estate car" or "estate" in the United Kingdom or a "wagon" in Australia and New Zealand.

The depot hackney or taxi, often on a Model T chassis with an exposed wood body, most often found around railroad stations was the predecessor of the station wagon body style in the United States. These early models with exposed wooden bodies became known as woodies.

In Germany, the term "Kombi" is used, short for Kombinationskraftwagen ("combination motor vehicle").

Station wagons have been marketed using the French term "break de chasse" (sometimes abbreviated to "break"), which translates as "hunting break", due to shared ancestry with the shooting-brake body style.

Manufacturers may designate station wagons across various model lines with a proprietary nameplate for marketing and advertising differentiation. Examples include "Avant", "Caravan", "Kombi", "Sports Tourer", "Sports Wagon", "Tourer", "Touring", and "Variant".

Design characteristics

Comparison with hatchbacks

Station wagons and hatchbacks have in common a two-box design configuration, a shared interior volume for passengers and cargo and a rear door (often called a tailgate in the case of a wagon) that is hinged at roof level. Folding rear seats (to create a larger space for cargo) are also common on both station wagons and hatchbacks.

Distinguishing features between hatchbacks and station wagons include:
 D-pillar: Station wagons are more likely to have a D-pillar (hatchbacks and station wagons both have A-, B-, and C-pillars).
 Cargo volume: Station wagons prioritize passenger and cargo volume — with windows beside the cargo volume. Of the two body styles, a station wagon roof (viewed in profile) more likely extends to the very rearmost of the vehicle, enclosing a full-height cargo volume — a hatchback roof (especially a liftback roof) is likely rake down steeply behind the C-Pillar, prioritizing style over interior volume or cargo capacity, sometimes having a shorter rear overhang and including smaller side windows (or no windows).

Other differences are more variable and can potentially include:
Cargo floor contour: A station wagon often has a fold-flat floor (for increased cargo capacity), whereas a hatchback is more likely to have a cargo floor with a pronounced contour.
Seating: Some station wagons have three rows of seats, whereas a hatchback will have two at most. The rearmost row of seating in a station wagon is often located in the cargo area and can be front-facing, rear-facing, or side-facing.
Rear suspension: A station wagon may include reconfigured rear suspension for additional load capacity and to minimize intrusion in the cargo volume.
Rear Door: Hatchbacks usually feature a top-hinged liftgate for cargo access, with variations ranging from a two-part liftgate to a complex tailgate that can function either as a full tailgate or as a trunk/boot lid. Station wagons have also been equipped with numerous tailgate configurations. Hatchbacks may be called Liftbacks when the opening area is very sloped and the door is lifted up to open. A design director from General Motors has described the difference as "Where you break the roofline, at what angle, defines the spirit of the vehicle", he said. "You could have a 90-degree break in the back and have a station wagon."

It has become common for station wagons to use a platform shared with other body styles, resulting in many shared components (such as chassis, engine, transmission, bodywork forward of the A-pillar, interior features, and optional features) being used for the wagon, sedan and hatchback variants of the model range.

Tailgate designs
Many modern station wagons have an upward-swinging, full-width, full-height rear door supported on gas springs — often where the rear window can swing up independently. A variety of other designs have been employed in the past.

Split gate 
The split-gate features an upward-swinging window combined with a downward-swinging tailgate, both manually operated. This configuration was common in the 1920s through the 1940s, and remained common on many models into the 1960s.

Retractable window
In the early 1950s, tailgates with hand-cranked roll-down rear windows began to appear. Later in the decade, electric power was applied to the tailgate window so it could be operated from the driver's seat as well as by the key in the tailgate. By the early 1970s, this arrangement was available on full-size, intermediate, and compact wagons. The lowered bottom hinged tailgate extended the cargo area floor and could also serve as a picnic table for "tailgating." 
 Side hinge: A side-hinged tailgate that opened like a door was offered on some three-seat station wagons to make it easier for the back row passengers to enter and exit their rear-facing seats.

Retractable roof
These have a retractable rear roof section, as well as a conventional rear tailgate that opened down, to carry tall objects upright. The configuration appeared on the Studebaker Wagonaire station wagon and the GMC Envoy XUV.

Dual and tri-operating gates

In the United States, Ford's full-size station wagons for 1966 introduced a system marketed as "Magic Doorgate" — a conventional tailgate with retracting rear glass, where the tailgate could either fold down or pivot open on a side hinge — with the rear window retracted in either case. Competitors marketed their versions as a Drop and Swing or Dual Action Tailgate. For 1969, Ford incorporated a design that allowed the rear glass to remain up or down when the door pivoted open on its side hinge, marketing the system, which had been engineered by Donald N. Frey as the "Three-Way Magic Doorgate". 

Similar configurations became the standard on full-size and intermediate station wagons from GM, Ford, Chrysler, and American Motors (AMC). GM added a notch in the rear bumper that acted as a step plate; to fill the gap, a small portion of the bumper was attached to the tailgate. When opened as a swinging door, this part of the bumper moved away, allowing the depression in the bumper to provide a "step" to ease entry; when the gate was opened by being lowered or raised to a closed position, the chrome section remained in place making the bumper "whole".

Clam shell

Full-size General Motors, from 1971 through 1976 station wagons (Chevrolet Kingswood, Townsman, Brookwood, Bel Air, Impala, and Caprice Estates; Pontiac Safari and Grand Safari; Oldsmobile Custom Cruiser, and the Buick Estate models) featured a 'clam shell' design marketed as the Glide-away tailgate, also called a "disappearing" tailgate because when open, the tailgate was completely out of view. On the clamshell design, the rear power-operated glass slid up into the roof and the lower tailgate (with either manual or optional power operation), lowered completely below the load floor. Where manually operated, the lower tailgate was counterbalanced by a torque rod similar to the torque rods used in holding a trunk lid open, requiring a  push to fully lower the gate. Raising the manual gate required a 5 lb pull via a handhold integral to the top edge of the retractable gate. The power operation of both upper glass and lower tailgate became standard equipment in later model years. Station wagons with the design were available with an optional third row of forward-facing seats accessed by the rear side doors and a folding second-row seat. They could accommodate  sheets of plywood or other panels with the rear seats folded. The clamshell design required no increased footprint or operational area to open, allowing a user to stand at the cargo opening without the impediment of a door — for example, in a closed garage. 

The GM design, as used in a Pontiac Grand Safari, with a forward-facing third-row seat and the clamshell tailgate was less popular with consumers and was described as the "least convenient of all wagon arrangements" with difficult passenger egress and problematic tailgate operation in comparison to the 1974 AMC Ambassador, Dodge Monaco, and Mercury Colony Park, full-size station wagons conducted by Popular Science magazine.
Subsequent GM full-size wagons reverted to the door/gate system for its full-size wagons.

Lift-gate

A simplified, one-piece lift-gate on smaller wagons. The AMC Hornet Sportabout was introduced for the 1972 model year featuring a "liftgate-style hatchback instead of swing-out or fold-down tailgate ... would set a precedent for liftgates in modern SUVs." The 1978-1996 GM's mid-size station wagons also returned to the upward-lifting rear window/gate as had been used in the 1940s.
 Swing-up window: An upward-lifting, full-height, full-width rear door, where the window on the rear door can be opened independently from the rear door itself. The window is also opened upwards and is held on pneumatic struts. The Renault Laguna II station wagon and Ford Taurus wagon featured this arrangement.
 Fold-up license plate: Wagons (including the Volvo Amazon wagon, early models of the Range Rover, and the Subaru Baja) had an upward folding hinged license plate attached to the lower tailgate of the split rear door. When the tailgate was folded down, the plate hung down and remained readable. The wagon versions of the Citroën DS, variously called the Break, Familiale, or Safari, had a different solution: two number plates were fitted to the tailgate at right angles to each other so one would be visible in either position.

Safety equipment
Cargo barriers may be used to prevent unsecured cargo from causing injuries in the event of sudden deceleration, collision, or a rollover.

Performance models 
Performance models of station wagons have included the 1970 Ford Falcon (XY) 'Grand Sport' pack, the 1973 Chevrolet Chevelle Malibu SS-454 and the 1992 BMW M5 (E34).

The 1994 Audi RS2, developed in conjunction with Porsche, has been described as the world's first performance station wagon. This was followed by the Audi RS4 and Audi RS6.

The 2006-2008 Dodge Magnum SRT-8 model brought together power and performance in a roomy station wagon.

Other German manufacturers have produced station wagon versions of their performance models, such as the Mercedes-AMG C63, Mercedes-AMG E63, BMW M5 (E60/E61), Volkswagen Golf R and Volkswagen Passat R36 wagons.

The Cadillac CTS-V Wagon introduced for the 2011 model year was considered the most powerful production station wagon offered with a manual transmission and the Corvette-engined version continued until 2014.

History by country

United States

1910 to 1940: Origins and woodie wagons 

The first station wagons were built in around 1910, by independent manufacturers producing wooden custom bodies for the Ford Model T chassis. They were originally called "depot hacks" because they worked around train depots as hacks (short for hackney carriage, as taxicabs were then known). They also came to be known as "carryalls" and "suburbans". Station wagons were initially considered commercial vehicles (rather than consumer automobiles) and the framing of the early station wagons was left unsheathed, due to the commercial nature of the vehicles. Early station wagons were fixed-roof vehicles, but lacked the glass that would normally enclose the passenger compartment, and had only bench seats. In lieu of glass, side curtains of canvas could be unrolled. More rigid curtains could be snapped in place to protect passengers from the elements outside. The roofs of "woodie" wagons were usually made of stretched canvas that was treated with a waterproofing dressing. The framing of the wooden bodies was sheathed in steel and coated with tinted lacquer for protection. These wooden bodies required constant maintenance: varnishes required re-coating and expansion/contraction of the wood meant that bolts and screws required periodic re-tightening. 

Manufacture of the wooden bodies was initially outsourced to custom coachbuilders, because the production of the all-wood bodies was very time-consuming. Eventually, car manufacturers began producing their own station wagon designs. In 1922, the Essex Closed Coach became the first mass-produced car to use a steel body (in this case, a fully enclosed sedan body style).  In 1923, Star (a division of Durant Motors) became the first car company to offer a station wagon assembled on its production line (using a wooden wagon body shipped in from an outside supplier). One of the first builders of wagon bodies was the Stoughton Wagon Company from Wisconsin, which began putting custom wagon bodies on the Ford Model T chassis in 1919 and by 1929 the Ford Motor Company was the biggest producer of chassis' for station wagons. Since Ford owned its own hardwood forest and mills (at the Ford Iron Mountain Plant in what is today Kingsford, Michigan in Michigan's Upper Peninsula) it began supplying the wood components for the Model A station wagon. Also in 1929, J.T. Cantrell began supplying woodie bodies for Chrysler vehicles, which continued until 1931.

By the 1930s, station wagons had become expensive and well-equipped vehicles. When it was introduced in 1941 the Chrysler Town & Country was the most expensive car in the company's model range. The first all-steel station wagon body style was the 1935 Chevrolet Suburban. As part of the overall trend in the automotive industry, wooden bodies were superseded by all-steel bodies due to their strength, cost, and durability. The commercial vehicle status was also reflected on those vehicles' registrations For example, there were special "Suburban" license plates in Pennsylvania used well into the 1960s, long after station wagons became car-based.

1945 to 1970: Steel-bodied station wagons 

The first all-steel station wagon was the 1935 Chevrolet Suburban, which was built on the chassis of a panel truck. However, most station wagons were produced with wooden bodies until after World War II.

When automobile production resumed after World War II, advances in production techniques made all-steel station wagon bodies more practical, eliminating the cost, noise, and maintenance associated with wood bodies. The first mass-produced steel-bodied station wagon was the 1946 Willys Station Wagon, based on the chassis of the Jeep CJ-2A. In 1947, Crosley introduced a steel-bodied station wagon version of the Crosley CC Four.

The first postwar station wagon to be based on a passenger car chassis was the 1949 Plymouth Suburban, which used a two-door body style. Several manufacturers produced steel and wooden-bodied station wagons concurrently for several years. For example, Plymouth continued the production of wooden-bodied station wagons until 1950. The final wooden-bodied station produced in the United States was the 1953 Buick Super Estate.

By 1951, most station wagons were being produced with all-steel bodies. Station wagons experienced the highest production levels in the United States from the 1950s through the 1970s as a result of the American Mid-20th century baby boom.

The late 1950s through the mid-1960s was also the period of greatest variation in body styles, with models available without a B-pillar (called hardtop or pillarless models) or with a B-pillar, both in 2-door and 4-door variants. 

The 1956 Rambler was an all-new design and the 4-door "Cross Country" featured the industry's first station wagon hardtop. However, the pillarless models could be expensive to produce, added wind noise, and created structural issues with body torque. GM eliminated the pillarless wagon from its lineup in 1959, while AMC and Ford exited the field beginning with their 1960 and 1961 vehicles, leaving Chrysler and Dodge with the body style through the 1964 model year.

1970 to 1990: Competition from minivans 

The popularity of the station wagon - particularly full-size station wagons - in the United States was blunted by increased fuel prices caused by the 1973 oil crisis. Then in 1983, the market for station wagons was further eroded by the Chrysler minivans, based on the K platform. While the K platform was also used for station wagon models (such as the Plymouth Reliant and Dodge Aries), the minivan would soon eclipse them in popularity. 

The US CAFE standards provided an advantage to minivans (and later SUVs) over station wagons, because the minivans and SUVs were classified as trucks in the United States, and therefore subject to less stringent fuel economy and emissions regulations. Station wagons remained popular in Europe and in locations where emissions and efficiency regulations did not distinguish between cars and light trucks.

1990 to present: Competition from SUVs 

The emergence and popularity of SUVs which closely approximate the traditional station wagon body style was a further blow. After struggling sales, the Chevrolet Caprice and the Buick Roadmaster, the last American full-size wagons, were discontinued in 1996. Smaller station wagons were marketed as lower-priced alternatives to SUVs and minivans. Domestic wagons also remained in the Ford, Mercury, and Saturn lines. However, after 2004 these compact station wagons also began to be phased out in the United States. The Ford Taurus wagon was discontinued in 2005 and the Ford Focus station wagon was discontinued in 2008. An exception to this trend was the Subaru Legacy and Subaru Outback station wagon models, which continue to be produced at the Subaru of Indiana plant. With other brands, the niche previously occupied by station wagons is now primarily filled with a similar style of Crossover SUV, which generally has a car underpinning and a wagon body.

Imported station wagons, despite remaining popular in other countries, struggled in the United States. European car manufacturers such as Audi, Volvo, BMW, and Mercedes-Benz continued to offer station wagons in their North American product ranges (marketed using the labels "Avant", "Touring", and "Estate" respectively). However, these vehicles had fewer trim and power train levels than their sedan counterparts. The Mercedes-Benz E63 AMG in Estate trim is a performance station wagon offered in the U.S. market. The station wagon variants of the smaller Mercedes-Benz C-Class line-up were dropped in 2007 and the BMW 5 Series Touring models were discontinued in 2010, due to slow sales in the United States with only 400 wagons sold in 2009. In 2012, the Volvo V50 compact station wagon was withdrawn from the U.S. market due to poor sales.

The Cadillac CTS gave rise to a station wagon counterpart, the 2010 CTS Sportwagon, which defied the trend by offering almost as many trim levels as its sedan counterpart. The CTS wagon, particularly in the performance CTS-V trim, received positive reviews until it was discontinued in 2014.

In 2011, the Toyota Prius V introduced hybrid power to the compact wagon market, but was discontinued in 2017 to streamline the Toyota hybrid lineup and focus on the RAV4 Hybrid Crossover SUV.

The 2015 VW Golf Sportwagen was marketed as a sub-compact station wagon in the North American market. This model was withdrawn from the US market after 2019.

In 2016, Volvo reintroduced a large wagon to the US market with the Volvo V90, but only by special order.

Simulated wood paneling 

As the wooden bodies were replaced by steel bodies from 1945 until 1953, manufacturers applied wooden decorative trim to the steel-bodied wagons, as a visual link to the previous wooden style. By the late 1950s, the wooden trim was replaced by "simulated wood" in the form of stick-on vinyl coverings. The woodgrain feature is not that the body is wood — or that it could ever be wood - rather, it is "totally honest in its artificiality."

The design element was also used on cars that were not station wagons, including sedans, pickup trucks, and convertibles. 

Unique simulated wood designs included trim on the body pillars of the compact-size Nash Rambler station wagons that went up the roof's drip rail and around on the spit liftgate While the larger Cross Country was available with bodyside wood trim that went unbroken up the C and D pillars to a thin strip on the roof above the side windows.

The Ford Country Squire is a model that was easily recognized by its simulated wood trim and the "Squire" trim level was an available option in a few different Ford model ranges, including the Falcon Squire, Fairlane Squire, and in the 1970s the Pinto Squire. The Squire was always the highest trim level of any Ford Wagon and included the signature woodgrain applique, and usually additional exterior chrome, better interior trim, special emblems, etc. The full-size Country Squire model was produced in higher quantities than the other Ford models.

Other woodie-style wagon models produced in significant numbers include the 1984-1993 Jeep Grand Wagoneer, 1957-1991 Mercury Colony Park, 1968-1988 Chrysler Town & Country, 1970-1990 Buick Estate, 1971-1992 Oldsmobile Custom Cruiser and 1969-1972 Chevrolet Kingswood Estate.

Full-size wagons 

From the 1950s until the 1990s, many full-size American station wagons could be optioned with a third row of seating in the cargo area (over the rear axle) for a total of nine seats. Before 1956, the third-row seats were forward-facing.

Chrysler's 1957 models had a roof too low to permit a forward-facing seat in the cargo area, so a rear-facing seat was used for the third row.

General Motors adopted the rear-facing third row for most models during 1959-1971 and 1977–1996. However, the 1964–1972 Oldsmobile Vista Cruiser and 1964–1969 Buick Sport Wagon featured raised roof lines beginning above the second-row seat and continuing all the way to the rear tailgate, resulting in the third row of seats being forward-facing. General Motors also used forward-facing seats for the third row in the 1971 through 1976 clam shell wagons.

The Ford and Mercury full-size wagons built after 1964 were available with four rows of seats, with the rear two rows in the cargo area and facing each other. The third and fourth rows were designed for two people each (although these seats were quite narrow in later models), giving a total seating capacity of ten people.

The trend since the 1980s for smaller station wagon bodies has limited the seating to two rows, resulting in a total capacity of five people, or six people if a bench front seat is used. Since the 1990s, full-size station wagons have been largely replaced by SUVs with three-row seating, such as the Chevrolet Suburban, Ford Expedition, Mercedes-Benz GL-Class, and Dodge Durango.

Two-door wagons 

The first two-door station wagon was the 1946 Willys Jeep Station Wagon. Other early two-door station wagons were the 1951 Nash Rambler and the 1954 Studebaker Conestoga. In 1956, Studebaker introduced three new two-door wagons in Pelham, Parkview, and Pinehurst trims.

General Motors began producing two-door station wagons in 1955 with the "Chevrolet Handyman" and the "Pontiac Chieftain". General Motors also introduced the sportier Chevrolet Nomad and Pontiac Safari to their lineup in 1955. Ford began production of steel-bodied two-door station wagons in 1952 with the Ford Ranch Wagon. In 1956 Ford responded to the Nomad and Safari with its own sporty two-door wagon, The Ford Parklane. The Parklane was a one-year-only model, succeeded by the Ford Del Rio in 1957.

After the merger of Nash and Hudson, the new company, American Motors (AMC) reintroduced the two-door wagon in the "new" Rambler American line in 1958. It was "recycling" with only a few modifications from the original version and targeted buyers looking for "no-frills" economy. American Motors' strategy of reintroducing an old design made for two distinct model runs, one of few examples where such a strategy has been successful for an automobile manufacturer.

The Chevrolet Vega Kammback, introduced in September 1970, was the first U.S.-made four-seat wagon and the first two-door wagon from GM in six years. It shared its wheelbase and length with Vega coupe versions and was produced in the 1971–1977 model years.

American Motors offered a two-door wagon version of the AMC Pacer from 1977 through 1980. 

The last two-door wagon available in America, the Geo Storm, was discontinued in 1993.

United Kingdom

1930s to 1960s 

Early station wagon cars were after-market conversions, with the new bodywork using a wooden frame and either steel or wooden panels. These wooden-bodied cars, produced until the 1960s, were amongst the most expensive vehicles at the time. Since the 1930s, the term shooting-brake (originally a term for hunting vehicles) has been an alternative, if now rarely used, to the term for station wagons in the UK.

Later, station wagons were produced by vehicle manufacturers and included the 1937 Commer (based on the Hillman Minx Magnificent), 1952 Morris Minor Traveller, 1952 Morris Oxford Traveller, 1954 Hillman Husky, 1954 Austin A30 Countryman and 1955 Ford Squire. The majority of these models were two-door wagons and several models were built on the chassis of relatively small cars.

Manufacturers often chose a specific model name to apply to all their station wagon cars as a marketing exercise — for example Austin used the Countryman name and Morris used the name Travellers. Some station wagons were closely derived from existing commercial van models, such as the Austin A30/35 Countryman and the Hillman Husky. Others, such as the Morris Travellers, the Austin Cambridge Countryman and the Standard Ten Companion were bespoke.

Rover and Austin produced 4×4 canvas-topped utility vehicles in the 1950s that were available in station wagon body styles that were sold as "Station Wagons". They incorporated better seating and trim than standard editions with options such as heaters. Early advertising for the Land Rover version took the name literally, showing the vehicle collecting people and goods from a railway station.

Despite the popularity of station wagons in America, station wagon offerings in the U.K. from Ford and Vauxhall were limited to factory-approved aftermarket conversions of the Ford Consul and Vauxhall Cresta, until the factory-built Vauxhall Victor wagon was introduced in 1958.

1960s to present 

One of the smallest station wagons ever produced was the Morris Mini Traveller / Austin Mini Countryman, introduced in 1960.

Ford's first factory-built wagon was the 1963 Ford Cortina.

The 1967 Hillman Husky station wagon version of the Hillman Imp was unusual in being a rear-engined station wagon.

Ford and Vauxhall produced factory-built station wagon variants of all three of their respective core models (small-, mid-, and large-size cars) by the 1970s. The FD- and FE-Series Vauxhall Victors, built between 1966 and 1978, were very large cars by British standards and featured station wagon models in the style of an American station wagon with front and rear bench seats and large-capacity petrol engines.

Other station wagons sold in the United Kingdom included the Morris 1100 (introduced in 1966), Vauxhall Viva (introduced 1967), Ford Escort (introduced in 1968), and Vauxhall Chevette (introduced 1976).

Germany

Germany is the largest market for station wagons in the world, with around 600,000 to 700,000 vehicles sold each year - amounting to 20% of all car sales. German-designed station wagons have been produced by Audi, BMW, Mercedes-Benz, Opel, and Volkswagen. Some larger station wagon models are available with a third row of seats, such as the rear-facing jump seat for two passengers in the cargo area of the Mercedes-Benz E-Class wagon.

In 1961, Volkswagen introduced the two-door "Variant" body style of the Volkswagen Type 3 (also known as the Volkswagen 1500 - later the Volkswagen 1600). The Type 3's rear-engine layout was retained for the station wagon models, but the engine profile was flattened, resulting in a small car offering interior room, as well as trunk space in the front. The model was offered through the 1973 model year.

Station wagons produced in East Germany include the 1956–1965 Wartburg 311/312/313, the 1963–1990 Trabant 601 Universal, and the 1966–1988 Wartburg 353 Tourist.

France

In France, almost all station wagon models are called a "Break", although the spelling is different from the English shooting brake.

The first station wagon produced by a French manufacturer was the Citroën Traction Avant Familiale model introduced in 1935. The first Peugeot station wagon was the Peugeot 203, introduced in 1950.

In 1958, the Citroën ID Break (known as the Safari in English-speaking countries) was introduced, being larger than other French station wagon models and of similar size to the contemporary full-size station wagons from the United States. It had a seating capacity of eight people, consisting of two front-facing bench seats and two folding inward-facing seats in the cargo area. The 'Familiale' version had a front bench seat, a forward-facing three-space bench seat in the middle, and a folding forward-facing three-seat bench in the rear, providing a versatile nine-seat car. The Citroën ID also had a two-part tailgate and a hydropneumatic suspension that allowed a self-leveling ride height and automatic brake biasing regardless of the load carried. The car could also 'kneel' to the ground for easy loading of heavy or large items. The successors to the ID, the Citroën CX and Citroën XM continued to be amongst the largest station wagon cars produced in Europe, but the model was discontinued in 2000 and a station wagon version was not available for its Citroën C6 successor.

The Peugeot 404, introduced in 1960, offered a conventional large station wagon alternative to the innovative Citroëns. Its replacement, the 505 was available in both five-seat and seven-seat 'Familiale' versions. As with the Citroëns, changing demands in the French car market led to the end of the large Peugeot station wagon models in the mid-1990s, with the smaller Peugeot 406 becoming the largest station wagon model in the range from 1995. In a similar situation to the United States, the decline of traditional Break and Familiale models in France was in no small part due to the introduction of the minivan in the form of the Renault Espace in 1984.

Sweden

The first station wagon produced in Sweden was the Volvo Duett, introduced in 1953. The Duett two-door wagon was conceived as a dual-function delivery van and people-carrier and is based on the chassis of the PV444 and PV544 sedans.

In 1962, the Volvo Duett was supplemented by a larger but lower Amazon, which has a four-door body and a horizontal split tailgate. Volvo continued production of station wagons through the Volvo 145 (introduced in 1967), then the Volvo 200 Series (introduced in 1974), and the Volvo 700 Series (introduced in 1985). In many markets, the station wagon models of the 700 Series significantly outsold the sedan models. In 1990, the 700 Series was replaced by the Volvo 900 Series, which was sold alongside the smaller Volvo 850 wagon that was introduced one year later. The 900 Series ended production in 1998 and its successor (the Volvo S80) did not include any wagon models. Volvo station wagons produced since the mid-1990s are the Volvo V40, Volvo V50, Volvo V60, Volvo V70, and Volvo V90, with the V40, V60, and V90 models currently in production.

Saab began producing station wagons in 1959, in the form of the Saab 95 two-door wagon, which was based on the Saab 93 sedan. Following a hiatus in station wagon production since the Saab 95 ended production in 1978, the company introduced the four-door Saab 9-5 station wagon in 1997, which was produced until 2010. In 2005 a 'Sportwagon' version of the Saab 9-3 was introduced and produced until 2011.

In 2017 station wagons accounted for 31% of all sold cars.

Switzerland
In 1983, station wagons represented 15% of the passenger car market, reflecting a trend throughout Europe of increasing popularity through the 1980s, with the vehicles becoming less cargo-oriented.

Japan

The first Japanese station wagon was the 1961 Isuzu Bellel four-door wagon, based on a compact sedan chassis. This was followed by the 1963 Mazda Familia, 1966 Toyota Corolla, 1967 Isuzu Florian, 1969 Mitsubishi Galant, 1973 Mitsubishi Lancer and 1974 Honda Civic wagons. However, Japanese manufacturers did not build station wagons in large volumes until recently.

Models marketed as passenger station wagons in export markets were often sold as utilitarian "van" models in the home market. Some were not updated for consecutive generations in a model's life in Japan. For example, a sedan might have a model life of four years, but the wagon was not updated for up to eight years (such as the Toyota Corolla wagon built from 1979 until 1987) and the 1987-1996 Mazda Capella wagon). Station wagons remain popular in Japan, although they are in slow decline as the SUVs and minivans have taken over a large portion of this market. Several Japanese compact MPVs such as Toyota Prius α take elements from older station wagons while being more in line with their corresponding category.

Korea
South Korean manufacturers do not have a strong tradition in producing station wagons. The first station wagon by the South Korean manufacturer was released way back in 1995 as the Hyundai Avante Touring (Lantra Sportswagon), followed in early 1996 as the Kia Pride station wagon. Daewoo Motor followed suit a year later with the first-generation Nubira.

South Korean manufacturer Kia produce both the Cee'd and Optima station wagons designated as Sportswagons with sister company Hyundai offering station wagon versions of the i30 and i40.

Australia

The first Australian-designed car was built in 1948 but locally designed station wagons did not appear until nine years later when the 1957 Holden FE was introduced. Holden's main competitor, the Ford Falcon (XK) introduced wagon models in 1960.

Ford and Holden produced wagon models based on each generation of their large sedan platforms until 2010. Other wagons produced in Australia include the smaller Toyota Camry and Mitsubishi Magna. The Ford and Holden wagons were usually built on a longer wheelbase than their sedan counterparts, until the introduction of the Holden Commodore (VE) which switched to sharing the sedan's shorter wheelbase.

Ford ceased production of wagons in Australia when the Ford Falcon (BF) ended production in 2010, largely due to the declining station wagon and large car market, but also following the 2004 introduction and sales success of the Ford Territory SUV. Production of wagons in Australia ceased in 2017 when the Holden Commodore (VF) ended production.

See also 

 Hearse
 Panel van
 Shooting-brake
 Sedan (automobile)
 Coupé
 Minivan

References

 
Car body styles